Geneva International Model United Nations (abbreviated GIMUN) is an entirely student-run Non Governmental Organization in Special Consultative Status with the Economic and Social Council of the United Nations since 2007. GIMUN is based in Geneva, Switzerland. It was created in 1999 by students of the Graduate Institute of International and Development Studies. Its aim is to promote the ideals and principles of the United Nations by giving students a chance to participate in educative events.

Activities

Annual Conference 

Every year in early Spring, GIMUN organizes its Annual Model United Nations conference. GIMUN is the only Model United Nations conference in the world to hold its entire conference within United Nations grounds within the United Nations Office at Geneva, which is the European Headquarters of the United Nations and formerly the League of Nations.

The Annual Conference consists of six committees with a maximum of 30 participants per committee. It is a bilingual conference, held in both English and French with live interpretation. All outcome documents are also translated into English and French. It includes the roles of Bloc Representative, Ambassador, as well as a team of journalists.

History of Annual Conferences

UN Day 

To celebrate the anniversary of the entering into force of the United Nations Charter, GIMUN annually collaborates with the United Nations Office at Geneva to bring a conference entitled “UN Day”, organized on the week of 24 October. UN Day gives young people the opportunity to express their visions regarding a selected topic under an underarching theme, in one of various panels lead by selected speakers who are specially invited for the occasion and specialized in the particular area of debate. In 2012, a special edition of UN Day was organized, in partnership with the Swiss National Youth Council SNYC, Youth Rep, and Junes, entitled "Decade". This was to commemorate the 10 year anniversary of Switzerland's adhesion to the United Nations.

Youth Perspectives 

Youth Perspectives is a conference aimed at giving young adults the opportunity to exchange their points of view, negotiate contrasting perspectives, elaborate a common position and then develop a sustainable solution for various issues of contemporary international relations. By gathering young people with the purpose of sharing their ideas, the conference aims at reaching conclusions that reflect the position of youth on those matters. Due to GIMUN's Special Consultative Status, the outcomes of this conference have been submitted to the United Nations ECOSOC Ministerial Review.

Study Trip 

Since 2009, GIMUN has organized educational trips, inviting students to visit a certain region of the world for a duration of between 1 and 2 weeks, to develop research on a particular theme of relevance to the United Nations mandate.

MUN Delegation 

MUN Delegation was created in 2010 under the name of "MUN Society" - a weekly reunion of Geneva students who wished to learn about MUN Procedure and simulate committees for one academic semester. In 2012, MUN Society added an objective of sending its participants to a Model United Nations Conference in Europe. In October 2013 and 2014, certain MUN Society members attended Oxford University Model United Nations. As of September 2014, MUN Society became MUN Delegation: a small group of selected students engaging in brief training sessions in specific preparation for an MUN Conference. In October 2014, the students went to OXIMUN again, while in Spring 2015 they attended Moscow International Model United Nations, in Russia.

International Geneva 

Since June 2014, GIMUN has organized a week-long itinerary to visit and discover the vast array of international organizations in Geneva.

References

External links
GIMUN Website

Model United Nations